Kolar Dam is an earthfill dam on Kolar river near Saoner, Nagpur district in the state of Maharashtra in India.

Specifications

Purpose
 Irrigation

See also
 Dams in Maharashtra
 List of reservoirs and dams in India

References

Dams in Nagpur district
Dams completed in 1984
1984 establishments in Maharashtra